Early general elections were held in the Netherlands on 8 September 1982. The Labour Party emerged as the largest party, winning 47 of the 150 seats in the House of Representatives; however, this would be the last time it did so until 1994.

the Centre Party won 0.8% of the vote, and one seat, which was taken by Hans Janmaat. This was the first time since the Second World War that a party considered to be right-wing extremist had won a seat in Dutch parliament.

Following the election the Christian Democratic Appeal (CDA) formed a coalition government with the People's Party for Freedom and Democracy, with the CDA's Ruud Lubbers becoming Prime Minister.

Results

By province

References

General elections in the Netherlands
1982 elections in the Netherlands
September 1982 events in Europe